Hernán Díaz may refer to:
Hernan Diaz (writer), Argentina writer raised in Sweden and living in the United States
Hernán Díaz Arrieta, Chilean writer, film critic and memoirist
Hernan Diaz Alonso, Argentine-American architect 
Hernán Díaz, Argentine football right back